Basadilwa is a village development committee in Parsa District in the Narayani Zone of southern Nepal. At the time of the 2011 Nepal census it had a population of 6,410 people living in 903 individual households. There were 3,291 males and 3,119 females at the time of census.

References

Populated places in Parsa District